Gennady Yuryevich Semigin (born March 23, 1964) is a Russian politician, the leader of nationalist Patriots of Russia party.

History 
Born March 23, 1964, in Khmelnitsky, Ukrainian SSR, Soviet Union, he studied in Riga on the history faculty, and then in the Moscow Institute of Jurisprudence. In the 1990s he ran a successful business. He is also a member of the Russian Academy of Science.

In 1999 and 2003 he was elected deputy of the State Duma from the Communist Party of the Russian Federation (CPRF). In the 2003 election he was the second ranked member on the CPRF list. The following year his ambitions of party leadership led him into conflict with the communist leader Gennady Zyuganov. Many old communists viewed rich Semigin as an opportunist, not a true member of the opposition. They labeled him a "mole" and the "Red oligarch". Despite this, Semigin was still elected chairman of the “People's Patriotic Union of Russia”, an umbrella organization that united the Communist party with minor opposition parties.

Semigin made several attempts to seize power from Zyuganov, including organisation of separate CPRF congress. But VTsIK didn't recognize Semigin's congress and pointed that only the official CPRF congress was legal. This congress voted to expel Semigin and his allies from the party.

In the Duma, Semigin moved to the Rodina faction, and at the same time founded his own party Patriots of Russia. He also organized the "People's Government" – the group of leftists politicians including Sergey Glazyev, Gennady Seleznyov and Gennady Gudkov that pretended to be a "future government".

On 24 March 2022, the United States Treasury sanctioned him in response to the 2022 Russian invasion of Ukraine.

Notes

External links
Gennady Semigin // Flb.ru

1961 births
Living people
People from Dunaivtsi
Communist Party of the Soviet Union members
Communist Party of the Russian Federation members
Patriots of Russia politicians
Third convocation members of the State Duma (Russian Federation)
Fourth convocation members of the State Duma (Russian Federation)
Russian businesspeople
Financial University under the Government of the Russian Federation alumni
Eighth convocation members of the State Duma (Russian Federation)
Kutafin Moscow State Law University alumni
Russian individuals subject to the U.S. Department of the Treasury sanctions